The League of Legends Pro League (LPL) is the top-level professional league for League of Legends in China. The first season of the LPL was the 2013 Spring season. The top three finishers of the playoff tournament receive automatic bids to the League of Legends World Championship. Playoffs are an eight team single elimination with each step a best-of-five series. The total prize pool is ¥2,350,000. In 2014 Riot Games began providing an English language broadcast. The format is modeled after the League of Legends Champions Korea format in South Korea. In September 2015 it was announced that Riot Games was in negotiations with Tencent to take over operations of the league. In 2019, Riot Games and Tencent created joint venture, TJ Sports, to focus on all League of Legends esports business in China, including tournament organizing, talent management, and venues.

Format
For the 2015 spring season the LPL adopted a best-of-two series. Teams compete in a double round robin.

From 2017 to 2018, the league used the same format as the EU LCS for selecting regular season groups. The highest ranked teams from the previous split headed the groups with other teams being selected. Matches were also best-of-three.

The LPL has used the following format since 2019:
 Regular season:
 All 16 teams compete in one group
 Single round robin, all matches are best-of-three
 Top eight teams advance to playoffs
 All matches are best-of-five
 First and second place teams from the regular season begin in the semifinals (round 3)
 Third and fourth place teams from the regular season begin in the quarterfinals (round 2)
 Fifth to eighth place teams from the regular season begin in the round 1.

The winner of the spring split represents China at the Mid-Season Invitational. The winner of the summer split (seed 1), the team with the most championship points (seed 2), and the winner and runners-up of the regional qualifier (seeds 3 & 4) qualify for the World Championship.

Current participants 

 Anyone's Legend
 Bilibili Gaming
 Edward Gaming
 FunPlus Phoenix
 Invictus Gaming
 JD Gaming
 LGD Gaming
 LNG Esports
 Ninjas in Pyjamas
 Oh My God
 Rare Atom
 Royal Never Give Up
 Team WE
 Top Esports
 TT Gaming
 Ultra Prime
 Weibo Gaming

Results

Top four finishes by team

References

External links
 Official website (Chinese)

 
2013 establishments in China
League of Legends competitions
Recurring sporting events established in 2013
Sports competitions in Shanghai
Sports leagues in China
Tencent
Esports competitions in China